The Joy Of… is an album by FourPlay String Quartet.This is their second studio album, though still predominantly consisting of covers, has more original pieces than their debut album.

Track listing

2000 albums
FourPlay String Quartet albums